Milecastle 38 (Hotbank) was a milecastle on Hadrian's Wall in the vicinity of Hotbank Farm,. It is notable for the joint inscription bearing the names of the emperor Hadrian and Aulus Platorius Nepos, the governor of Britannia at the time the Wall was built.

Description
The site of Milecastle 38 is in the vicinity of Hotbank Farm, Little remains of the milecastle except rubble walls outlined by robber trenches.

Excavations
It was found to have a short axis, with a Type I gateway. Pottery finds indicated an occupation of the 4th century. A tombstone was found, inscribed "...us.. xit annis... mensibus du...ebus quinque", re-used as a pivot stone in the south gateway.

Inscription
Milecastle 38 is notable for the joint inscription bearing the names of the emperor Hadrian and Aulus Platorius Nepos, the governor of Britannia at the time the Wall was built. The left-hand part was found c. 1715 and the right-hand part was found in 1829.

The stone reads:
IMP CAES TRAIAN
HADRIANI AVG
LEG II AVG
APLATORIONEPOTELEGPRPR
The first two lines identifies the emperor Hadrian, the third the Legion – Legio secunda Augusta (Second Augustan Legion) which erected the plaque, and the fourth the governor Aulus Platorius Nepos.

Associated turrets 

Each milecastle on Hadrian's Wall had two associated turret structures. These turrets were positioned approximately one-third and two-thirds of a Roman mile to the west of the Milecastle, and would probably have been manned by part of the milecastle's garrison. The turrets associated with Milecastle 38 are known as Turret 38A and Turret 38B.

Turret 38A
Turret 38A (Milking Gap) was located by exploratory excavation in 1911. There are no visible remains.

Turret 38B
Turret 38B (Highshield Crag) was also located by exploratory excavation in 1911. The turret is only visible as an earthwork platform.

Public access
The milecastle, and the sites of both turrets, are accessible via the Hadrian's Wall Path.

References

External links 

38